Treadway may refer to:

 Treadway (surname)
 Treadway Russell Nash (1724–1811), English clergyman and historian
 Treadway, Tennessee, United States, an unincorporated community
 Treadway Racing, a former auto racing team

See also
 Committee of Sponsoring Organizations of the Treadway Commission
 Treadway bridge, a type of pontoon or floating bridge
 Tredway, a surname
 Treadaway, a surname